Ahram Rural District is in the Central District of Tangestan County, Bushehr province, Iran. At the census of 2006, its population was 10,990 in 2,621 households; there were 11,632 inhabitants in 3,152 households at the following census of 2011; and in the most recent census of 2016, the population of the rural district was 8,689 in 2,599 households. The largest of its 41 villages was Bazui, with 1,344 people.

References 

Rural Districts of Bushehr Province
Populated places in Tangestan County